Magic Bullet Productions is an independent audio-production company formed in 2000 by Alan Stevens, focusing on Doctor Who and Blake's 7 spinoff audios. Originally set up to produce the Kaldor City audios, in 2004 they acquired the rights to produce Lawrence Miles' Faction Paradox audio CDs.

Magic Bullet Audios
Kaldor City
Occam's Razor (2001) by Alan Stevens and Jim Smith
Death's Head (2002) by Chris Boucher
Hidden Persuaders (2003) by Jim Smith and Fiona Moore
Taren Capel (2003) by Alan Stevens
Checkmate (2003) by Alan Stevens
The Prisoner (2004) by Alan Stevens and Fiona Moore (co-production with MJTV).
Storm Mine (2004) by Daniel O'Mahony
Metafiction (2012) by Alan Stevens and Fiona Moore
The True History of Faction Paradox
Coming to Dust (2005) by Lawrence Miles
The Ship of a Billion Years (2006) by Lawrence Miles
Body Politic (2008) by Lawrence Miles
Words from Nine Divinities (2008) by Lawrence Miles
Ozymandias (2009) by Lawrence Miles
The Judgment of Sutekh (2010) by Lawrence Miles
Other
The Time Waster (2012) by Alan Stevens
Radio Bastard (2013) by Alan Stevens, Fiona Moore, Robert Barringer-Lock and Steven Allen

External links
Magic Bullet's website

References

Audio plays based on Doctor Who